Ausar may refer to:

 Osiris, an Egyptian god, usually identified as the god of the afterlife, the underworld and the dead.
 Serchio, the third longest river in the Italian region of Tuscany, known in antiquity as Auser.
 Ausar Auset Society, a Pan-African religious organization, with chapters all across the United States
A brutal deathless warlord from the game Infinity Blade